Atractus melas, the dark ground snake,  is a species of snake in the family Colubridae. The species can be found in Colombia.

References 

Atractus
Reptiles of Colombia
Endemic fauna of Colombia
Reptiles described in 1908
Taxa named by George Albert Boulenger